Janatha Garage is a 2016 Indian Telugu-language action drama film written and directed by Koratala Siva. The film stars Mohanlal, N. T. Rama Rao Jr., Samantha and Nithya Menen. The plot revoles around Sathyam (Mohanlal) and Anand (Jr. NTR) an environmental activist. Anand is recruited by Sathyam, who operates a large automobile service center named "Janatha Garage" and undertakes law enforcement through his group of automobile mechanics, because the legal agencies are thought to be inadequate. Devi Sri Prasad, scored the music for the film, whilst Tirru and Kotagiri Venkateswara Rao, handled the cinematography and editing of the film respectively.

Janatha Garage was released worldwide on 2 September 2016. The film registered the highest opening for a Telugu film in 2016 and is the second highest Telugu opening of all time, behind Baahubali: The Beginning. Janatha Garage was the highest-grossing Telugu film of the year. The film won two awards at the 64th National Film AwardsSpecial Jury Award for Mohanlal and Best Choreography for Raju Sundaram. It also won seven Nandi AwardsBest Popular Feature Film, Best Actor (Jr. NTR), Best Supporting Actor (Mohanlal), Best Story Writer (Koratala Siva), Best Choreographer (Sundaram), Best Art Director (A. S. Prakash), and Best Lyricist (Ramajogayya Sastry).

Plot
Sathyam is a small workshop owner in a village. Upon his brother Shiva's encouragement, he opens a workshop, under the name of Janatha Garage, in Hyderabad. One day, a poor man who is a friend of Sathyam loses his college-going daughter in a road accident. Sathyam and his allies learn that she was assaulted and killed by some goons. They ask Shiva's friend DSP Chandrashekar's help, but is helpless as there is no proper evidence against them given that they have an influential background. Janatha Garage becomes a self-appointed group of citizens led by Sathyam who undertake law enforcement by killing the goons and making it look like an accident. Chandrasekhar becomes aware and warns them against taking the law into their hands as he is worried about the consequences.

Janatha Garage becomes popular among the local people as they believe that they'll get justice from them. Shiva marries a Mumbai-based man Suresh's sister, and they have a son Anand. One day Mukesh, a powerful entrepreneur with a lot of illegal dealings and also the brother of a goon who was killed by Sathyam, visits and warns him. A few days later, Shiva and his wife get ambushed by Mukesh's men, and both are killed. Fearing for Anand's safety, Sathyam asks Suresh to take him away from his family and Janatha Garage. As the years' pass, Anand grows up as an environmental science graduate and activist in Mumbai, who is against any activity which can harm the environment. Suresh's daughter Bujji and Anand are in love with each other, and her parents are happy with that. Anand meets Anu, who is Chandrashekhar's daughter, scolds her for using firecrackers during Diwali where the two become friends.

Anand gets into a fight with a powerful local MLA. Fearing for his safety, Suresh sends him away to Hyderabad under the pretext of a university exchange program. Meanwhile, Raghava, Sathyam's son, marries Mukesh's daughter without his family's approval. Sathyam meets with an accident planned by Mukesh, but recovers. Janatha Garage is now inactive solving the problems of the common men as Sathyam was asked not to take any stress. Anand fights off Raghava's thugs regarding an illegal mining field. Sathyam meets with Anand, and both develop mutual respect, without knowing they are uncle and nephew. Sathyam asks Anand to take over the garage. Anand quickly becomes a family member of the house, where they save a strict government officer Vikas from some of Mukesh's men. Janatha Garage becomes popular among the public once again.

Chandrashekar, now the Commissioner of Police, finds out about Anand and brings Suresh and his family. Sathyam and others are shocked to know that Anand is actually Shiva's son. Suresh, who is bothered about Bujji's safety, asks Anand to choose either Bujji or Janatha Garage. With a heavy heart, Anand chooses to stay with his father's family, and he and Bujji say goodbye tearfully. She marries a boy of her parents's choice. Meanwhile, Raghava and his wife leave Sathyam's house because of their uncultured lifestyle, creating a ruckus with Anand and the family. One day, a bomb blast occurs where Sathyam's closest allies named Bose, loses his loved one in the blast. The next day, Bose's corpse is found on the railway track, with reports citing that he committed suicide.

The police chief asks Chandrasekhar to close the case. Chandrasekhar comes to Janatha Garage for help. Anand finds out that Bose was killed by Raghava as Bose had found Raghava and Mukesh wanted to topple the government and planned the blasts in the city. Sathyam decides that even though Raghava is his son, he doesn't deserve to live. Anand and others from Janatha Garage beat up Mukesh's men in their hideout. Anand kills Mukesh, and Raghava pleads for mercy. Sathyam arrives and kills Raghava without remorse. Later, on the occasion of Diwali, Anand, despite being requested to stay at home for the festivities by Padma, goes to help someone with Sathyam's approval, while Anu,now Anand's wife smiles at him.

Cast

Production

Development
Koratala Siva decided to finalise his next project with N. T. Rama Rao Jr., after the reception of his Mahesh Babu-starrer Srimanthudu (2015). According to a report from Ritz Magazine, dated 21 September 2015, the makers decided to plan the shoot in January 2016, after NTR completing his work with Nannaku Prematho (2016). On 4 October 2015, Mythri Movie Makers, which produced Siva's earlier film Srimanthudu, had announced their confirmation on teaming up with the project titled as #NTR26. A formal launch ceremony was held on 25 October 2015, at the office of the film's production house, with the makers revealing the film's title as Janatha Garage. The film's technical department included composer Devi Sri Prasad, editor Kotagiri Venkateswara Rao and art director A. S. Prakash, who worked in the director's previous film, alongside cinematographer Tirru. On 26 November 2015, the makers have announced that Mohanlal was signed in to a play a pivotal role, thus marking his third film in Telugu film after Gandeevam (1994) and Manamantha (2015).

Casting
Amyra Dastur, Samantha Ruth Prabhu and Parineeti Chopra were considered playing the female lead opposite NTR. But in December 2015, it was confirmed that Samantha Ruth Prabhu will be playing the female lead marking her fourth collaboration with NTR, along with Nithya Menen as the second female lead. Malayalam actor Unni Mukundan was reported to play the antagonist in January 2016. It was also reported that Unni Mukundan will be playing the role of the son of Mohanlal and Cousin of Jr. NTR. Reportedly, this movie is a family drama, and it deals about the issues between two cousins, played by NTR and Unni Mukundan. In February 2016, it was reported that former Tamil actress Devayani would play the wife of Mohanlal's character. The very same month Brahmaji, Sai Kumar, Ajay, Sithara were included in the film's cast. It was reported that Sai Kumar, the latter would play the father of Jr. NTR. In March 2016, Rahman was reported to be part of this movie playing as brother to Mohanlal.

Filming
The regular shooting of this film was expected to begin on 9 February 2016. Art Director AS Prakash erected a huge set at Saradhi Studios, Hyderabad during the first week of January 2016, which costs around 3 crores. It was reported that this movie will be shot mainly in Hyderabad, Mumbai and Kerala. The film's shooting was launched on 22 February 2016, with the first schedule took place at the Ramoji Film City in Hyderabad, and it was wrapped up in four days. The second schedule featuring NTR and Menen, was commenced in Mumbai on 5 to 22 March, after which the unit returned to Hyderabad. The third schedule began in Hyderabad on 25 March in the specially erected set at Saradhi Studios. Samantha joined the shooting in this schedule, and scenes featuring Mohanlal, Jr. Ntr, Samantha, and Unni Mukundan were filmed in this schedule.

After a brief break, NTR joined the sets of the film on 5 May 2016, while Mohanlal was reported to join the shoot only in June 2016, as he had to complete wrapping up his Priyadarshan-directorial Oppam (2016). Mohanlal later joined the sets in Hyderabad. Few portions of the film shot in Chennai, were wrapped in the end of the month. Mohanlal completed his portions on mid-June. The team underwent post-production formalities during the intermediate schedule, whilst the makers planned for a grand song shoot. While the makers planned to rope Tamannah Bhatia, for the song shoot, her dates were not available and the team chose Kajal Aggarwal. On 23 August 2016, the makers announced that they have completed the shooting of the film.

Music

The film's soundtrack album is composed by Devi Sri Prasad. Janatha Garage marks Prasad's second collaboration with the director Koratala Siva, after Mirchi (2013) and Srimanthudu (2015). The regular music sitting discussions were held at the composer's studio in February 2016, with Prasad and Siva being present. Ramajogayya Sastry wrote lyrics for the songs. The makers planned to release the audio on mid-July 2016. However, it was revealed that the audio launch event will be held on 12 August 2016, at the Shilpakala Vedika in Hyderabad. The film's cast and crew (excluding Samantha), attended the event, with Mahesh Babu, gracing the event as the chief guest. Lahari Music label, released the soundtrack digitally on the day of its release.

Behindwoods praised Janatha Garage album as a "promising one from DSP- Koratala Siva after the super successful Srimanthudu", and gave 2.75 out of 5 stars. Indiaglitz gave 3.25 out of 5, stating "The album passes muster in terms of the music." Moviecrow gave the album 2.25 out of 5 and then stated "Devi Sri Prasad's Janatha Garage is far from his best work and the album is filled with hackneyed tunes which bog down the listener's interest." 123Teugu stated "The album is an emotional one which gives importance to the situations in the film and will grow on you more when you listen to them multiple times."

Release
Producer Naveen Yerenini, on the film's launch, originally slated that the film will release on 12 August 2016, which falls on the Independence Day weekend. However, due to delay in post-production activities, and also the release of Mohanlal's another Telugu film Manamantha on 5 August, prompted the makers to postpone the film's release on 2 September 2016, during the eve of Ganesh Chathurthi. On 26 August, the film was awarded a U/A certificate by the Central Board of Film Certification.

Janatha Garage was released on 1610 screens in India and around 2010 screens worldwide. It was one of the biggest release for a Telugu film. Preview shows were started across US theatres on 31 August. The movie ran for 50 days in 39 centers in AP and Telangana.

It was also dubbed in Malayalam and released in Kerala by Maxlab Cinemas and Entertainments. The film was also dubbed in Hindi as Janta Garage and released on YouTube by Goldmines Telefilms on 24 June 2017. The film was also dubbed in Odia as Janatha Gyarege by Raja Ram Cine Production in 2018.

Distribution 

Pre-release business 

Marketing 
On the occasion of N.T. Rama Rao Jr.'s birthday, the makers unveiled the first look poster on 20 May 2016, along with a motion poster. On 21 May 2016, another poster featuring Mohanlal was released, coinciding with his birthday. On 6 July 2016, coinciding with the occasion of Ramzan, the makers unveiled the official teaser of the film, and got more than 24,000 likes in one hour of its release. The teaser gained three million views within four days and more than 67,000 likes, becoming the most liked teaser in Tollywood. The film's theatrical trailer was unveiled on 12 August 2016, at the film's audio launch event held at Shilpakala Vedika in Hyderabad.

Home media 
The television premiere of Janatha Garage took place on 23 October 2016, and registered a record TRP rating of 20.69, which is the highest in the year. It is available on OTT through Hotstar.

Reception

Critical reception
Janatha Garage received positive reviews from critics, with critics praising the performances of Jr. NTR and Mohanlal respectively. Writing for The Times of India, critic Pranita Jonnalagada gave 3 out of 5 stars and stated "This Janatha Garage might give everyone a hand in repairs but they need a wee bit of repair themselves for sure. But that’s no reason to miss the film." A critic from Sify gave 3 out of 5 and summarised "Janatha Garage is tailor made for those who are there to be excited about the hero's antics. Some repair to the script could have genuinely helped here." Sangeetha Devi Dundoo of The Hindu, being more critical on the script stated "NTR and Mohanlal’s performances save an otherwise tepid film." Writing for Firstpost, critic Latha Srinivasan stated "Janatha Garage may not be one of director Koratala Siva's best films but it is a film that has its moments where Mohanlal and NTR Jr shine."

S. Srivatsan of India Today, became more critical and gave 1.5 out of 5 stating "Siva somehow readies the audience for a promising entertainer; however, ends up delivering a bland surreal revenge drama." The Indian Express gave a negative review, stating, "Despite a good message, Mohanlal and Jr NTR film is a predictable, run-of-the-mill drama that fails to offer anything new" giving 2 out of 5 stars. A review from Deccan Chronicle stated The film is slower than Koratala Shiva's earlier films and falls short of expectations, by giving the film two-and-a-half out of five stars. However, a review from The New Indian Express, praised Mohanlal's acting and further stated "Janatha Garage could've been even better had it been a bit crisper and better packaged. But it's a decent film with a good story and some terrific performances." 123 Telugu gave 3.25 out of 5 stars and stated "Janatha Garage is not your regular popcorn entertainer which Tollywood churns out every week. It is a character-driven film where the onus is on serious emotions."

Sowmya Rajendran of The News Minute, panned the film as "it has been directed like a melodramatic mega serial". News18 gave the film 3 out of 5 and then stated, "The one-line stories that Koratala tries to expand into feature films revolve around his heroes’ abilities alone." Indiaglitz gave the film 2 out of 5 and stated "A routine hero-versus-villain story with a small innovation in the hero's characterization." Behindwoods gave the film 2.75 out of 5 and stated that "a satisfying entertainer, despite being slightly cheesy". Greatandhra.com rated Janatha Garage 2.75/5, stating " The movie can be watched for some moments in the second half and NTR’s terrific performance. Not a good movie but not totally bad either". Another reviewer idlebrain Jeevi rated 3/5, complaining about the movie "lacking emotional impact".

Box office
Janatha Garage opened to 1,950 screens across the world on the day of its release (2 September 2016), and it collected  on its opening day, Thus registering the highest opening for a Telugu film in 2016, and is the second highest opening of all time, behind Baahubali: The Beginning. The film also collected , in its opening weekend, the second fastest Telugu movie to achieve 50-crore mark in the opening weekend. Janatha Garage collected 62 crores share at the end of 7 days run, becoming the second best opening week of Telugu cinema.

According to a report from International Business Times, the movie collected more than  within 18 days, thus becoming the second Telugu film in the year, to cross this mark after Sarrainodu (2016). At the end of its theatrical run, the film collected , emerging as the highest grossing Telugu film of the year, and also the third biggest grosser of Telugu cinema.

Accolades

References

External links 
 
 

2010s Telugu-language films
2016 films
2016 action drama films
Indian action drama films
Environmental films
Films shot in Mumbai
Films about corruption in India
Films shot in Hyderabad, India
Films shot at Ramoji Film City
Social realism in film
Law enforcement in fiction
Fictional portrayals of the Telangana Police
Fictional portrayals of the Andhra Pradesh Police
Films about social issues in India
Films shot in Telangana
Films scored by Devi Sri Prasad
2016 masala films
Films about mining
Indian films based on actual events
Indian vigilante films
Films featuring a Best Choreography National Film Award-winning choreography
Films directed by Koratala Siva
2010s vigilante films
Mythri Movie Makers films